Patrice A. Oppliger (born 26 August 1963), is the assistant professor of communication at Boston University College of Communication.

Oppliger has written extensively about the impact of popular culture on student's high school years, and has been consulted by the media on the subject. Interviewed by CNN about cyberbullying, Oppliger discussed the film "Mean Girls", which is based on the book "Queen Bees and Wannabes" by Rosalind Wiseman. Oppliger accused the film of "glamorizing bad behavior", she went on to say that, "The book is a helpful guide to relationships between girls; the movie, on the other hand, showed the positive side of being a mean girl."

WFXT Fox25 News also interviewed Oppliger about Rockport High School's decision to ban female students from wearing yoga pants. She said that the school ought to have judged the students on a "case-by-case" basis instead.

Education 
Patrice Oppliger gained her degree from the University of Nebraska at Kearney, her masters from the University of Maine, and her doctorate University of Alabama.

Bibliography

Books

Chapters in books

Journal articles

Mainstream press

Academic journals

References

External links 
 Profile page: Patrice Oppliger Boston University

1963 births
American public relations people
American social commentators
Boston University faculty
Living people
Men and masculinities scholars
School counseling
University of Alabama alumni
University of Maine alumni
University of Nebraska at Kearney alumni
Women's studies academics